Janq'u Willk'i (Aymara janq'u white, willk'i gap,"white gap", also spelled Jankho Willkhi) is a  mountain in the Bolivian Andes. It is located in the La Paz Department, Loayza Province, Luribay Municipality. Janq'u Willk'i lies west of Kuntur  Jiwaña.

References 

Mountains of La Paz Department (Bolivia)